Audiovisual (AV) is electronic media possessing  both a sound and a visual component, such as slide-tape presentations, films, television programs, corporate conferencing, church services, and live theater productions.

Audiovisual service providers frequently offer web streaming, video conferencing, and live broadcast services.

Computer-based audiovisual equipment is often used in education, with many schools and universities installing projection equipment and using interactive whiteboard technology.

Components 
Aside from equipment installation, two significant elements of audiovisual are wiring and system control. If either of these components are faulty or missing, the system may not demonstrate optimal performance. 

Wiring is a skill that not only requires proper cable rating selection based on a number of factors, including distance to the main rack, frequency and fire codes, but wires should also be out of sight, behind the walls and in the ceiling, when possible. System performance also depends on the integrity of the wires. If wires become exposed or mishandled during cabling, the signals may not transmit fluidly, which could compromise the quality. Wires should be neatly organized into the main component and properly labeled for easy reference. 

Control refers to how the system will operate and how all the installed components will communicate. System automation devices from manufacturers like RTI, Crestron, Control4, AMX, Lightware and others are programmed to integrate the various components of the system and makes the system easy to use from various devices. For example, when programmed appropriately, a control system can allow a TV in zone one to automatically turn off when the music in zone two is turned on. Without proper control programming, the TV in zone one would stay on, even when the music in zone two is turned on.

Residential
Generally, residential audiovisual encompasses in-ceiling speakers, flat-panel TVs, projectors, and projector screens. This could include lighting, blinds, cinema rooms, etc.

Commercial
The professional audiovisual industry is a multibillion-dollar industry, comprising manufacturers, dealers, systems integrators, consultants, programmers, presentations professionals, and technology managers of audiovisual products and services.

Commercial audiovisual can be a lengthy process to install and configure correctly. Boardroom audiovisuals can be installed for a number of reasons and often is due to the executives of the organization or business needing to have meetings with colleagues, customers and suppliers around the world. When creating an array of boardrooms for customers it beneficial to balance the pattern from the audio and microphone so there is no degradation in sound quality for the individuals listening.

The proliferation of audiovisual communications technologies, including sound, video, lighting, display, and projection systems is evident in many sectors of society. This includes business, education, government, the military, healthcare, retail environments, worship, sports and entertainment, hospitality, restaurants, and museums. The application of audiovisual systems can be found in collaborative conferencing (which includes video-conferencing, audio-conferencing, web-conferencing, and data-conferencing), presentation rooms, auditoriums and lecture halls, command and control centers, digital signage, and more. Concerts and corporate events are among the most obvious venues where audiovisual equipment is used in a staged environment. Providers of this type of service are known as rental and staging companies, although they may also be served by an in-house technology team (e.g., in a hotel or conference center).

See also
Audiovisual art
Audiovisual education
Audiovisualogy
Information and communications technology
Jam2jam, audiovisual software for collaborative performance
Multimedia
Video
Visual music, the visual presentation of sound, another audiovisual expression
World Day for Audiovisual Heritage

References

Multimedia
Television terminology